Beryozovye Islands (Finnish: Koivisto, Swedish: Björkö; literally: "Birch Islands"), alternatively spelled Berezovye Islands, is an island group in Leningrad Oblast, Russia. The islands are situated at the head of the Gulf of Finland, just outside the town of Primorsk on the Karelian Isthmus.

There are 15 islands in the group, the largest is Bolshoy Beryozovy (Large Berezovy, Finnish: Koivistonsaari). Other islands include Zapadny Beryozovy (West Beryozovy, Finnish: Tiurinsaari) and Severny Beryozovy (North Beryozovy, Finnish: Piisaari). The total area of the group, stretching along the coast for 200 km, is 92 km². They are protected by the state as a seabird sanctuary and one of the Ramsar sites in Russia.

Before the third Swedish crusade, the islands paid tax to Novgorod; after the crusade they became Swedish. In 1721 they became part of Russia, and in 1812 they were restored to the Grand Duchy of Finland with the province of Vyborg. In independent Finland they belonged to the parish then called Koivisto (Swedish: Björkö). The main settlement on the islands was then called Saarenpää (Krasnoostrovskiy). After World War II, they were ceded by Finland to the Soviet Union. The whole historical Finnish population was expelled and replaced by a population of Soviet origin from September 1944 onwards. Place names were russified after 1947 concurrently with the rest of the formerly Finnish Karelian Isthmus occupied in 1944.

The islands gave their name to the Treaty of Björkö (1905).

See also 
 Björkö (disambiguation)
 Keskisaari

References

Russian islands in the Baltic
Islands of Leningrad Oblast
Ramsar sites in Russia